Heiligenkreuz im Lafnitztal is a town in the district of Jennersdorf in the Austrian state of Burgenland close to the Austria/Hungary border.

Geography
Cadastral communities are Heiligenkreuz im Lafnitztal and Poppendorf im Burgenland.

Population

References

External links
 
 http://www.lafnitztal.info/

Cities and towns in Jennersdorf District
Slovenian communities in Burgenland